Cedric Elmer Ritchie,  (August 22, 1927 – March 20, 2016) was a Canadian businessman and chairman and CEO of The Bank of Nova Scotia. He was also chairman of the Business Development Bank of Canada since 2001.

Career
At age 17, Ritchie, the son of a potato farmer, began working as a teller in The Bank of Nova Scotia's Bath, New Brunswick branch. In 1958, he became assistant branch manager in Toronto and chief general manager in 1970.

Honours 
In 1981, he was made an Officer of the Order of Canada in recognition of "his wide knowledge of banking and commerce". He was inducted into the Canadian Business Hall of Fame in 2000.

Election to board of directors 
In 2003, he was appointed to the Board of Directors of Twin Mining Corporation. He is also a member of the Board of Director of Canada Post.

Honorary degrees
LL.D., St. Francis Xavier University, December 1979
LL.D., Dalhousie University, May 1983
LL.D., Queen's University, June 1984
LL.D., University of New Brunswick, October 1985
LL.D., Mount Allison University, October 1986

Awards
Sikatuna Award, Philippines

References

External links
 

1927 births
2016 deaths
Canadian bank presidents
Canadian corporate directors
Officers of the Order of Canada
People from Carleton County, New Brunswick
Directors of Scotiabank
Canadian chairpersons of corporations
Canadian chief executives